A Star Wars Pez is a Pez candy dispenser themed after the Star Wars movies, and is one of the company's most prominent merchandising deals. Over 90 dispensers have been released on the market from 1997 to 2022, among the many collectibles spawned by the franchise.

The extreme interest of marketing executives in all things Star Wars has spawned a scholarly interest in the "materializing fantasy media" such as these PEZ dispensers. It has also led to several museums to feature such Stars Wars memorabilia in their exhibits and/or gift shops, as well as media attention on this fairly odd phenomenon.

In museum exhibits and gift shops
In recent years, several museums around the United States have featured Star Wars Pez in their exhibits and/or gift shops. These products are displayed and exhibited because they are classic Americana. Despite the dispensers' "popularity and cult status," the manufacturer's original factory in Austria does not give tours or sell fancifully-shaped memorabilia. Only in January 2012, this group of dispensers became prominently displayed at the company's new North American headquarters in Orange, Connecticut: one travelogue wrote, "The company has been making the cartoonish plastic heads for 60 years now, representing everything from Star Wars to U.S. presidents to the Geico chameleon."

The Clayton Historical Museum, in Clayton, California opened a new exhibit on the history of candy manufacture in January 2012 that featured these confectionery dispensers.

Pez with Star Wars characters have been featured prominently in the Star Wars Museum in Maryland. The Star Wars Pez dispensers are pictured on a fan website, which describes them as "some Candy Heads from 1980".

The Pacific Science Center sold Pez at a popular exhibit about "Star Wars".

These branded dispensers were among the "top sellers" at the gift shop at the Burlingame Museum of Pez Memorabilia, outside San Francisco. The museum also displayed "a whole lot of Star Wars Pez," in Plexiglas displays. This "unofficial shrine" to the collectibles is unaffiliated with Pez Candy, Inc., and the manufacturer sued the Burlingam museum in 2009 for copyright infringement. There was a notorious, giant Pez sculpture of C-3PO and Chewbacca locked in a slash fiction kiss. As of December 2019, the museum is now closed.

Another Pez museum in Easton, Pennsylvania also has featured prominently their obligatory Star Wars memorabilia, ("Of course, we had to include the Star Wars Pez Dispensers"), including an oversize Darth Vader figurine. As of early 2012, this museum appears to have closed to the public.

Other influences
Carrie Fisher's "Princess Leia Pez dispenser" is one of the "merchandising horrors" she discusses in her one-woman show Wishful Drinking.

These candy dispensers are featured prominently in the 2010 Emmy Award-winning fan film, Star Wars Uncut.

Star Wars Pez has a gateway drug-like effect for some young collectors. One fan of Pez dispensers started her huge horde with Star Wars figurines at the age of three. Another fan calls Pez dispensers generally "a 'gateway drug' to hardcore collecting". Pezheads shopping for new dispensers frequently place "Star Wars" first on their shopping lists.

Chronology of releases 
Five Star Wars Pez were released in 1997:

 Darth Vader
 Yoda
 Chewbacca (first version)
 C-3PO
 Stormtrooper (first version)

Four Star Wars Pez were released in 1998 in advance of the May 19, 1999 premier of Star Wars: Episode I – The Phantom Menace:

 Luke Skywalker
 Princess Leia
 Wicket the Ewok
 Boba Fett

Also released in 1999 was a Jar Jar Binks Pez Hander battery operated toy.

Three Star Wars Pez were released in 2002 for Star Wars: Episode II – Attack of the Clones:

 Jango Fett
 Clone Trooper
 R2-D2

In 2003 Pez released three Limited Edition Collectable Crystal Star Wars dispensers:

 Darth Vader
 Yoda
 C-3PO

14 Giant Pez were released in 2005 to "commemorate" Star Wars: Episode III – Revenge of the Sith:

 Darth Vader
 Clone Trooper
 R2-D2
 C-3PO
 Death Star
 Chewbacca
 Yoda
 General Grievous
 Emperor Palpatine
 Darth Vader (Metal Vader)
 Yoda (Crystal Yoda)
 C-3PO (Metal C-3PO)
 Chewbacca (Bronze Chewbacca)
 General Grievous (Pearl Grievous)

Pez also released five standard-size dispensers in 2005 for the Star Wars: Episode III – Revenge of the Sith movie release:

 Emperor Palpatine
 General Grievous
 Death Star (first version)
 Chewbacca (second version)
 Emperor Palpatine (glow-in-the-dark version), a Walmart exclusive

Walmart released an exclusive limited edition gift set in 2005 containing nine Star Wars Pez dispenses previously available individually. That same year, PEZ also released the same nine dispensers in a special numbered limited edition set.

 Death Star (first version)
 Boba Fett
 General Grievous
 Emperor Palpatine (glow-in-the-dark version)
 Darth Vader
 R2-D2
 Chewbacca (second version)
 Yoda (second version)
 C-3PO

For the 2009 animated release of Star Wars: The Clone Wars (film) Pez released three dispensers:

 Obi-Wan Kenobi
 Anakin Skywalker
 Ahsoka

Pez released two dispensers in 2012 for the 3D release of Star Wars: Episode I – The Phantom Menace:

 Darth Maul
 Yoda (second version)

Two Star Wars Pez were released in 2013: 

 Re-issued & re-painted Boba Fett (now with a green base)
 Giant Darth Vader

Four limited edition crystal Star Wars Pez were released in 2015 as a gift tin:

 Crystal Darth Vader
 Crystal Yoda
 Crystal C-3PO
 Crystal R2-D2

In 2016 a Rogue One gift tin was released containing four dispensers:

 Stormtrooper (first version, re-released)
 Death Trooper → 
 Darth Vader (second version, originally released in 2015)
 Death Star (second version, updated design)

From 2016 - 2017 seven individual Pez were released for Star Wars: The Force Awakens and Rogue One:

 BB-8
 First Order Stormtrooper → 
 Kylo Ren (first version)
 Porg
 Praetorian Guard
 Rey (Star Wars) (first version, with a grey base)
 Stormtrooper Executioner → 

In 2017 a Millennium Falcon gift tin was released containing four dispensers:

 Rey (Star Wars) (first version, with a grey base)
 BB-8
 Han Solo (first version)
 Chewbacca (second version, re-released)

For the 2018 theatrical release of Solo: A Star Wars Story a gift tin containing four dispensers was released:

 Chewbacca (third version)
 Han Solo (second version)
 Lando Calrissian
 L3-37

A giant BB-8 was also released in 2018.

In 2019 to celebrate the premier of The Mandalorian, Pez partnered with Funko to produce seven Star Wars dispensers akin to the Pop! Vinyl line of figures:

 Boba Fett Holiday
 Boba Fett
 Bossk
 Logray
 Lando
 Ponda Baba
 Snaggletooth

For the 2019 holiday season a limited edition gift tin of which "only 75,000 tins" were produced, with four dispensers, was released for Star Wars: The Rise of Skywalker:

 First Order Stormtrooper (2017 version, re-released) → 
 Kylo Ren (second version, red cracked mask)
 Sith Trooper → 
 White Rocket (Jet) Trooper → 

For the 2019 theatrical release of Star Wars: The Rise of Skywalker four dispensers were released:

 D-O (Star Wars)
 Rey (Star Wars) (second version, white base)
 Kylo Ren (second version, red cracked mask)
 Sith Trooper → 

Pez released six new dispensers in 2020:

 Darth Vader (giant, metallic finish) to commemorate the 40th Anniversary of Star Wars: The Empire Strikes Back
 The Mandalorian gift set containing:
 Grogu (on mini base) 
 The Mandalorian (Star Wars character)
 Grogu (regular height base)
 The Mandalorian (Star Wars character) (same dispenser in gift tin)
 Funko Gift Set containing:
 The Mandalorian (Star Wars character)
 Grogu

In 2021 Pez released the first two Star Wars Pez Clips, a new short-base format "to take on the go." These were sold in a 2-pack including: 

 Grogu
 The Mandalorian (Star Wars character)

During November 2022 Pez released six new dispensers including a gift tin to coincide with the debut of The Mandalorian (Star Wars character) and Grogu at Star Wars: Galaxy's Edge, in Disneyland Park.

 Boba Fett (new paint & small dent on helmet)
 The Mandalorian gift tin with 4 dispensers:
 The Mandalorian (Star Wars character) (2020 version)
 Grogu (in hovering pram)
 Fennec Shand
 Boba Fett (2022 version)
 2 Walmart exclusive Christmas Pez:
 Grogu (with “Galaxy's Greetings” in white letters on red base)
 Grogu (with “Merry Force Be With You” in white letters on red base)

References

Further reading

 Peterson, Shawn (2001). Collectors Guide to Pez: Identification and Price Guide. Krause Publications, 2001.

External links
 Retro to Go: Star Wars-themed Pez dispensers
 PEZ Museum, Bay Area images of Star Wars and other Pez on Flickr
 "May the Pez be with you" and "Star Wars signed" images of Star Wars Pez (images 10 and 11 of 15) on CNet.com

Star Wars merchandise
Pez